In cricket, a tie occurs when the match is concluded with each team having scored exactly the same number of runs and the side batting last having completed its innings. The definition of a completed innings would be if all ten batsmen have been dismissed or the pre-determined number of overs have been completed. It is rare for first-class matches to end in ties and, in more than 200 years of first-class cricket, it has happened on just 67 occasions, two of those in Test matches.

The earliest known instance of a tie is in a single wicket "threes" match at Lamb's Conduit Field on Wednesday, 1 September 1736. Three London players were matched against three of Surrey. Although the sources give different totals for each innings, they are agreed that both teams totalled 23 overall. London batted first and scored either 4 and 19, or 3 and 18. Surrey replied with either 18 and 5, or 17 and 6. Five years later, the same two teams produced the earliest known tie in an eleven-a-side match. The first tie in a match later given first-class cricket status was in 1783 between a Hampshire XI and a Kent XI.

A tie was previously sometimes declared where the scores were level when scheduled play ended, but the side batting last still had wickets in hand. In 1948, the rules were changed so that when this occurs the match is declared a draw. This happened in a Test between England and Zimbabwe in 1996. England needed 205 to win the match in their fourth innings, off 37 overs, but finished the day 204/6. With three runs required off the last ball, Nick Knight was run-out going for the third, thus making it the first time in Test history that a match had finished drawn with scores level. It happened again in 2011, in a Test between India and the West Indies at Mumbai, this time with nine wickets down in the fourth innings.

In January 2021, the final of the 2020–21 Quaid-e-Azam Trophy in Pakistan finished as a tie, the first tie in the final of a domestic first-class cricket tournament.

Below is a list of all first-class matches that have been declared tied, including those before 1948 which would have been draws in the modern era.

Hampshire v Kent 1783

MCC v Oxford & Cambridge Universities 1839

Surrey v Kent 1847

Surrey v MCC 1868

Surrey v Middlesex 1868

Wellington v Nelson 1873/74

Surrey v Middlesex 1876

Gentlemen v Players 1883

Surrey v Lancashire 1894

Worcestershire v South Africans 1901

Middlesex v South Africans 1904

Lancashire v England XI 1905

Surrey v Kent 1905

MCC v Leicestershire 1907

Jamaica v MCC 1910/11

Somerset v Sussex 1919

Orange Free State v Eastern Province 1925/26

Essex v Somerset 1926

Gloucestershire v Australians 1930

Victoria v MCC 1932/33

Worcestershire v Somerset 1939

Southern Punjab v Baroda 1945/46

Essex v Northamptonshire 1947

Hampshire v Lancashire 1947

DG Bradman's XI v AL Hassett's XI 1948/49

Hampshire v Kent 1950

Sussex v Warwickshire 1952

Essex v Lancashire 1952

Northamptonshire v Middlesex 1953

Yorkshire v Leicestershire 1954

Sussex v Hampshire 1955

Victoria v New South Wales 1956/57

TN Pearce's XI v New Zealanders 1958

Essex v Gloucestershire 1959

Australia v West Indies 1960/61

Bahawalpur v Lahore B 1961/62

Hampshire v Middlesex 1967

England XI v England Under-25s 1968

Yorkshire v Middlesex 1973

Sussex v Essex 1974

South Australia v Queensland 1976/77

Central Districts v England 1977/78

Victoria v New Zealanders 1982/83

Muslim Commercial Bank v Railways 1983/84

Sussex v Kent 1984

Northamptonshire v Kent 1984

Western Province v Eastern Province 1984/85

Eastern Province B v Boland 1985/86

Natal B v Eastern Province B 1985/86

India v Australia 1986/87

Gloucestershire v Derbyshire 1987

Bahawalpur v Peshawar 1988/89

Wellington v Canterbury 1988/89

Sussex v Kent 1991

Nottinghamshire v Worcestershire 1993

Somerset v West Indies A 2002

Warwickshire v Essex 2003

Worcestershire v Zimbabweans 2003

Habib Bank Limited v Water and Power Development Authority 2011/12

Border v Boland 2012/13

Police Sports Club v Kalutara Physical Culture Club 2016/17

Windward Islands v Guyana 2017/18

Chilaw Marians Cricket Club v Burgher Recreation Club 2017/18

Negambo Cricket Club v Kalutara Town Club 2017/18

Bloomfield Cricket and Athletic Club v Sri Lanka Army Sports Club 2017/18

Lancashire v Somerset 2018

Khyber Pakhtunkhwa v Central Punjab 2021

See also
 Tied Test
 List of tied One Day Internationals
 List of tied Twenty20 Internationals

References

Lists of cricket matches
First-class cricket matches
First-class cricket records